Lime Kiln Hollow is a valley in McDonald County in the U.S. state of Missouri.

Lime Kiln Hollow was named for the fact a lime kiln once operated in the valley.

References

Valleys of McDonald County, Missouri
Valleys of Missouri